The 17th Canadian Folk Music Awards were presented on April 3, 2022, to honour achievements in folk music by Canadian artists in 2021.

Nominees and recipients

References

External links
 Canadian Folk Music Awards

17
Canadian Folk Music Awards
Canadian Folk Music Awards
Canadian Folk Music Awards